Twijzel is a village in Achtkarspelen in the province of Friesland, the Netherlands, with a population of around 1080.

The village was first mentioned around 1240 as Twislum, and means near the crossroads. Twijzel was a stretched linear settlement along the road. The Dutch Reformed Church has a 13th century tower. The church itself was built in 1692 as a replacement of its medieval predecessor. Twijzel was home to 927 people in 1840.

Notable buildings 
 The Protestant church of Twijzel

Gallery

References

Achtkarspelen
Populated places in Friesland